Cardonald College was a medium-sized Further education institute located in Glasgow's South Side, in Scotland. Officially opened in 1972, it had over 12,000 full-time and part-time students.  Cardonald College merged with Anniesland College and Langside College in 2013 to become Glasgow Clyde College.

The main campus was located in the South Cardonald area of Cardonald, close to Mosspark.

Mosspark Drive Campus

The Mosspark Drive Campus is located on Mosspark Drive. 
In 2004 Building Design Partnership was appointed architect and design team leader for a major refurbishment and development project at the campus. This comprised building a new Family Centre and an Industry Skills Centre, as well as refurbishment of the existing tower block at the campus.  The Skills Centre was partly financed by a donation from the Robertson Trust of £100,000.

Running of the College

In 1975 Strathclyde Region became the administering authority of the college.

In 1993 the funding of further education colleges passed from local government to central government and the responsibility for Cardonald College devolved to a Board of Management.

Qualifications

Cardonald College offered a range of qualifications certified by the Scottish Qualifications Authority. A number of these were:

Intermediate 1
Intermediate 2
Highers
Higher National Certificate
Higher National Diploma
Professional Development Awards
Scottish Vocational Qualification

Organisation

Cardonald College was split up into five faculties:

Access & Continuing Learning
Care, Science & Sport
Creative Industries
Technology & Business
Training Solutions

Courses

Chartered insurance institution

Cardonald College became the first Scottish higher education facility to become accredited by the Chartered Insurance Institute for its financial planning course.

HMIE Inspection

Her Majesty's Inspectorate of Education is a government organisation in charge of checking the quality of education proved at a learning facility.

The most recent HMIE inspection took place on week beginning 10 March 2008.

HMIE found that Cardonald College had effective learning and teaching processes. Also that it was helping students progress, achieving suitable outcomes and that the college is managing well and increasing the quality of its services for its students

Mergers

On 17 November 2011, Cardonald College announced it had entered merger talks with Anniesland College and on 28 March 2012 it was announced by Cardonald College principal, Susan Walsh, that a merger with Cardonald College, Anniesland College and Langside College was "highly likely."

On 30 July 2012, the colleges agreed to push ahead with merger plans and named The Guardian reporter and Cardonald College journalism lecturer, Kirsty Scott, the Merger Communications Manager.

On 28 August 2012, a formal consultation was launched which ran until 16 November 2012.

On 14 December 2012, Cardonald College principal Susan Walsh was appointed principal of the new college.

On 1 August 2013, Cardonald College, along with Anniesland College and Langside College, were absorbed to form Glasgow Clyde College. As a result of the merger, Cardonald College became Glasgow Clyde College.

Alumni
Libby McArthur, Scottish actress
Robert Carlyle, Scottish actor

References

The Drum (2009). http://www.thedrum.co.uk/news/2009/09/21/11429-freight-rebrands-and-repositions-cardonald-college
Glasgow Architecture (2004). http://www.glasgowarchitecture.co.uk/cardonald_college.htm
The Robertsone Trust (2007). https://web.archive.org/web/20090802094046/http://www.therobertsontrust.org.uk/index.php/case_studies/cardonald_college_and_the_beatson_oncology_centr
Post Online (2008). http://www.postonline.co.uk/post/news/1260065/scottish-college-insurance?page=post_breakingnews_story&tempPageName=699623.
The Glasgow Story (2004). http://www.theglasgowstory.com/image.php?inum=TGSA05226
HMIE (2008). https://web.archive.org/web/20110604220159/http://www.hmie.gov.uk/documents/inspection/Cardonald%20College%20Summary.pdf
Tic Toc (2009). http://www.tictocfamily.com/showcase/276_cardonald-college

External links
Cardonald College - Official website

Further education colleges in Glasgow